Between the Sheets is a one-act play written by Jordi Mand. It received its first full production with Nightwood Theatre in Toronto in 2012, and it has also been produced by The Basement Theatre in Auckland, New Zealand in 2013  and Pi Theatre in Vancouver, British Columbia, Canada in 2014.

The play deals with both special-needs children and sexual affairs, and includes drama and occasional suspense.

The script was released in print in 2014 by the Playwrights Canada Press.

Characters

Casts

References

External links
 Between the Sheets at the Playwrights Guild of Canada
 The Globe and Mail review, September 18, 2012
 The Globe and Mail review, September 25, 2012
The National Post review, September 28, 2012
The New Zealand Herald review, November 16, 2013
The New Zealand Herald review, November 21, 2013
The Georgia Straight review, March 11, 2014
Vancity Buzz review

2012 plays
Canadian plays
Two-handers